General elections were held in the Dominican Republic on 15 March 1924. Horacio Vásquez of the Progressive National Alliance won the presidential election, whilst his party also won the parliamentary elections and the Constitutional Assembly election.

Results

References

Dominican Republic
1924 in the Dominican Republic
Elections in the Dominican Republic
Presidential elections in the Dominican Republic
Election and referendum articles with incomplete results
March 1920 events